William McCleary (November 5, 1853 – May 22, 1917) was an Ontario merchant and political figure. He represented Welland in the Legislative Assembly of Ontario as a Conservative member from 1890 to 1894 and in the House of Commons of Canada from 1896 to 1900 as a Conservative member.

He was born in Thorold, Canada West in 1853, the son of Beatty McCleary and Matilda McCabe, both Irish immigrants, and was educated there and at Toronto. In 1877, McCleary married Jennie E. Ewart. He was a lumber merchant at Thorold, a partner in a company which operated saw and planing mills there, and also served as reeve and mayor of the town. McCleary was also warden for Welland County. He was defeated in the 1894 provincial election, then was elected to the federal parliament in 1896 but was unsuccessful in a bid for reelection in 1900. McCleary was a member of the Thorold Board of Trade and a prominent member in the local chapter of the Ancient Order of United Workmen. He was also a member of the local Orange Lodge and of the Freemasons.

External links 
The Canadian parliamentary companion, 1891 JA Gemmill
Member's parliamentary history for the Legislative Assembly of Ontario

Jubilee history of Thorold township and town ...,MHS Weatherill (1933)
The History of the County of Welland, Ontario, its past and present (1887)

1853 births
1917 deaths
Progressive Conservative Party of Ontario MPPs
Conservative Party of Canada (1867–1942) MPs
Members of the House of Commons of Canada from Ontario
Mayors of Thorold
People from Thorold